The Nordmøre og Romsdal Fotballkrets (English: Nordmøre and Romsdal Football Association) is one of the 18 district organisations of the Norwegian Football Federation. It administers lower tier football in the traditional districts of Nordmøre and Romsdal.

Background 
Nordmøre og Romsdal Fotballkrets, is the governing body for football in the traditional districts of Nordmøre and Romsdal, which today is a part of the county Møre og Romsdal. The Association currently has 59 member clubs. Based in Molde, the Association's Chairman is Evy Austad.

Affiliated members
The following 59 clubs are affiliated to the Nordmøre og Romsdal Fotballkrets:

Åndalsnes IF
Aure IL
IL Averøykameratene
Bæverfjord IL
Batnfjord IL
Bjørset FK
Bøfjord IL
Bolsøya IL
IL Braatt
IL Bryn
Bud IL
Clausenengen FK
Dahle IL
Eide og Omegn FK
Eidsøra IL
Eidsvåg IL
Ekko/Aureosen IL
Elnesvågen og Omegn IL
Eresfjord og Vistdal FK
Ertvågsøya IL
Fiksdal/Rekdal BK
Frei FK
IL Goma
Gossen IL
IL Grykameratene
Halsa IL
Hjelset-Kleive Fotball
Innfjorden IL
Isfjorden IL
Kristiansund BK
Kristiansund FK
Kvass/Ulvungen FK
Kårvåg/Havørn Fotball
Langfjorden FK
Malmefjorden IL
Meek IL
Midsund IL
Molde FK
Molde Studentenes IL
Måndalen IL
IL Nordlandet
Øksendal IL
Øvre Surnadal IL
Reinsfjell FK
SK Rival
IL Samhald
Skåla IL
Smøla IL
IL Søya
Straumsnes IL
Sunndal IL Fotball
Surnadal IL
Tingvoll IL
Todalen IL
Tomrefjord IL
SK Træff
Valsøyfjord IL
Vestnes Varfjell IL
Vågstranda IL

League competitions 
Nordmøre og Romsdal Fotballkrets run the following league competitions:

Men's football
4. divisjon  -  one section
5. divisjon  -  one section
6. divisjon  -  three sections

Women's football
3. divisjon  -  one section

References

External links

Nordmøre og Romsdal
Sport in Møre og Romsdal